PDL is an initialism for:

Politics 
Democratic Liberal Party (Partidul Democrat Liberal), a former political party in Romania
Labour Democratic Party (Partito Democratico del Lavoro), a former political party in Italy
Pole of Freedoms (Polo delle Libertà), a former political alliance in Italy
The People of Freedom (Il Popolo della Libertà), a former political party in Italy
 Free Destourian Party (Parti Destourien Libre), a current political in Tunisia

Science, mathematics and technology

Computing
Page description language
Perl Data Language and the data type it supports
Program Design Language, a method of software construction
Progressive download
Public Documentation License, used with OpenOffice.org

Other uses in science and technology
Periodontal ligament
Power door locks
Propositional dynamic logic
Pulsed dye laser
Poundal, a unit of force (abbreviated pdl)
Polarization Dependent Loss, see Polarization mode dispersion

Sport 
Premier Development League, the former name of a developmental soccer league in the United States and Canada now known as USL League Two.
Professional Development League, an English system of youth football leagues.

Other uses 
PDL BioPharma, formerly Protein Design Labs
João Paulo II Airport (IATA code PDL)
Previously developed land, see Brownfield land
Ponta Delgada Airport
Poorly Drawn Lines, an absurdist webcomic